Eduard "Ede" Geyer (born 7 October 1944) is a German former professional football player and manager. He was the last manager of the East Germany national team.

Playing career

Geyer was born in Bielsko (Bielitz), during the German occupation of Poland. His family fled to Dresden after the end of World War II, and he began his football career with SC Einheit Dresden. In his youth was a goalkeeper, but he began his career playing as an attacker, later moving into defence. He joined Dynamo Dresden in 1968, where he played until his career ended in 1975 for health reasons. In total, he had played 112 games for the club, scoring twelve times, and was twice East German champion and won one cup.

Coaching career

Geyer moved into coaching, working with Dynamo's youth team, and assisting first-team manager Klaus Sammer, whom he succeeded in 1986. He won the DDR-Oberliga in 1989, ending BFC Dynamo's ten-year dominance. He also reached the UEFA Cup semi-finals that year, before going onto manage the East Germany national team. His time in charge was to be short-lived, however, as the side disappeared with the reunification of East and West Germany. After a brief spell scouting at Schalke 04, he moved to Hungary, managing BFC Siófok for a year before returning to Sachsen Leipzig. Under Geyer, the team captured the NOFV-Oberliga (IV) title in 1993, but the club was denied promotion due when denied a licence to play in the Regionalliga (III) for financial reasons. He moved on a year later, joining Energie Cottbus where he enjoyed great success, advancing the previously unheralded club through two promotions into the first division Bundesliga. Under his direction the team was able to stay up for three years despite having a very small budget. He also took his side to the DFB-Pokal (German Cup) final in 1997. After relegation to the 2. Bundesliga in 2003, the team was unable to bounce back, finishing 14th in 2004–05, which spelled the end of Geyer's tenure at Cottbus. He spent six months in the United Arab Emirates with Al Nasr, before returning to Sachsen Leipzig, initially as sporting director, but later as manager. He left Sachsen at the end of the 2006–07 season, due to financial problems, and returned to Dynamo Dresden three months later, hoping to spearhead their qualification for the 3. Liga or higher. They did qualify for the third division, but results were generally poor, and Geyer was sacked in June 2008.

Trivia

Geyer is well known in Germany for his outspoken manners. While coaches usually wrap critical statements in media friendly euphemisms, he's known to speak his mind in a very forthright manner. Examples include:

"Manche junge Spieler haben eine Einstellung zum Leistungssport wie die Nutten auf St. Pauli. Die rauchen, saufen und huren rum, gehen morgens um 6 Uhr ins Bett."

(Some young players tackle the sport like the whores at St. Pauli. They smoke, they drink, fuck around and go to bed at 6 in the morning)

"Die Fans wollen keine Spiele, bei denen man erkennt, dass manche Spieler nachher kein Deo brauchen."

(The fans don't want to see games where you can tell that the players don't need an antiperspirant afterward.)

"Wer so doof ist, gehört nicht in die Bundesliga."

(Someone, who's so stupid doesn't belong in the Bundesliga.)

Honours

As a player

 DDR Under-16 Cup: 1961
 DDR Oberliga: 1971, 1973
 FDGB Pokal: 1971

As a manager

 DDR Youth Championship: 1976, 1985
 DDR Oberliga: 1989
 NOFV-Oberliga: 1993
 Regionalliga Nordost: 1997
 DFB Pokal: Runner-up 1997
 2. Bundesliga: Third place 2000

References

External links

 

1944 births
Living people
People from Bielsko
East German footballers
Dresdner SC players
Dynamo Dresden players
Dynamo Dresden II players
German football managers
Dynamo Dresden managers
Footballers from Dresden
German footballers
East German football managers
East Germany national football team managers
FC Energie Cottbus managers
Dynamo Dresden non-playing staff
DDR-Oberliga players
Association football defenders
People of the Stasi
Silesian-German people
People from Bezirk Dresden
BFC Siófok managers
German expatriate sportspeople in Hungary
German expatriate football managers
Expatriate football managers in Hungary
Expatriate football managers in the United Arab Emirates
German expatriate sportspeople in the United Arab Emirates